The Subcommittee on Health Care and Financial Services is a subcommittee of the United States House Committee on Oversight and Accountability. It was revived for the 118th Congress by chairman James Comer after Republicans regained control of the House of Representatives.

Until the 115th Congress, the subcommittee was known as the Subcommittee on Health Care, Benefits and Administrative Rules. Its jurisdiction included the Census Bureau, the National Archives and Records Administration, health care, and the District of Columbia. It was previously known as the Subcommittee on Information Policy, Census, and National Archives. During the 112th Congress, the Oversight and Government Reform Committee went through a reorganization under chairman Darrell Issa. As a result, jurisdiction over several matters were shifted between various subcommittees. For example, Information Policy, which as formally under the jurisdiction of the subcommittee, was transferred a new Subcommittee on Technology, Information Policy, Intergovernmental Relations and Procurement Reform. Jurisdiction over matters involving the District of Columbia were transferred to the subcommittee from the former United States House Oversight Subcommittee on Federal Workforce, Post Office, and the District of Columbia.

Members, 115th Congress

References

Oversight Energy Policy, Health Care and Entitlements